The Centre for Polish-Russian Dialogue and Understanding (Polish Centrum Polsko-Rosyjskiego Dialogu i Porozumienia) initiates and supports projects improving dialogue and understanding between Poland and Russian Federation. The Centre is a state legal person supervised by the Ministry of Culture and National Heritage since April 19, 2011 according to the March 2011 law.

Creation of parallel Polish and Russian dialogue centres was decided during President Medvedev's visit to Poland in December 2010.
Russia created the Centre for Russian-Polish Dialogue and Reconciliation in Moscow, which however does not cooperate with the Polish one and its director Juri Bondarenko presents controversial opinions about Russian-Polish relations.

Directors
Sławomir Dębski 2011-2016
Ernest Wyciszkiewicz 2016-

Advisory Council
Andrzej Nowak - historian
Sławomir Dębski - director of Polish Institute of International Affairs
Andrzej Grajewski - Deputy Editor-in-chief of the weekly Gość Niedzielny
Jacek Miler - Director of the Department of Cultural Heritage of the Polish Ministry of Culture and National Heritage
Maria Przełomiec - journalist of Telewizja Polska

Projects
School Afloat - sailing camp for Polish and Russian youth, led by Krzysztof Baranowski
Football Championship for boys and girls living around Polish-Russian border 
Club of Gdańsk - meeting point for Polish and Russian young leaders
The Intersection Project: Russia/Europe/World is an online platform 
Summer School (Poland, Russia, Germany, Ukraine)

Cultural exchange
Teatr.doc has been invited to Warsaw.

Books
The Centre has published two books about Polish-Russian history.

References

External links
Official page

Poland–Russia relations